Ismo Lius (born 30 November 1965) is a Finnish former professional footballer who played as a  forward.

During his club career, Lius played for Kuusysi Lahti, Örgryte IS, HJK Helsinki, RoPS and FC Hämeenlinna. Lius led the league in goal-scoring during 1986, 1986, 1988 and 1989. He made 36 appearances for the Finland national team, scoring 4 goals.

References

External links
 
 

1965 births
Living people
Sportspeople from Lahti
Finnish footballers
Association football forwards
Finland international footballers
Veikkausliiga players
Allsvenskan players
Mestaruussarja players
FC Lahti players
Örgryte IS players
Helsingin Jalkapalloklubi players
Rovaniemen Palloseura players
FC Hämeenlinna players
Finnish expatriate footballers
Expatriate footballers in Sweden
Finnish expatriate sportspeople in Sweden